Mount Holly is an unincorporated community in Westmoreland County, in the U. S. state of Virginia.

The plantation houses Bushfield and Spring Grove are nearby and are listed on the National Register of Historic Places.

References

GNIS entry

Unincorporated communities in Virginia
Unincorporated communities in Westmoreland County, Virginia